Crepis sibirica is an Asian and eastern European species of plants in the tribe Cichorieae within the family Asteraceae. It has been found in China (Heilongjiang, Liaoning, Inner Mongolia, Xinjiang), Mongolia, Russia, Central Asia, and eastern Europe.

Crepis sibirica is a perennial herb up to 150 cm (5 feet) tall, spreading by means of large underground rhizomes. It produces a flat-topped  array of several flower heads. Each head has many yellow ray florets but no disc florets. The species grows on mountain slopes and in forests and grasslands.

References

External links
Plantarium, Красивые платья красивым девушкам, Русскоязычные названия, Систематика, Crepis sibirica L. Описание таксона in Russian with photos
Czech Botany, Crepis sibirica L. – škarda sibiřská / škarda sibírska in Czech with photos

sibirica
Plants described in 1903
Flora of Asia